Czyżew  is a town in Wysokie Mazowieckie County, Podlaskie Voivodeship, in north-eastern Poland. It is the seat of the gmina (administrative district) called Gmina Czyżew.

Czyżew previously held town rights from 1738 to 1870; it became a town again on 1 January 2011. The town was re-formed from three villages: Czyżew-Osada ("settlement"), Czyżew-Złote Jabłko ("golden apple") and Czyżew-Stacja ("station"). On the same date the district was renamed from Gmina Czyżew-Osada to Gmina Czyżew.

As of December 2021, the town has a population of 2,621.

References

Cities and towns in Podlaskie Voivodeship
Wysokie Mazowieckie County
Łomża Governorate
Białystok Voivodeship (1919–1939)
Warsaw Voivodeship (1919–1939)
Belastok Region